The 2010–11 Stanbic Bank 20 Series was a Twenty20 cricket competition held in Zimbabwe from 13 – 21 November 2010. It was won by the Mashonaland Eagles, who defeated the Mid West Rhinos in the final by one run.

The Eagles finished the group stage of the competition as the top team, losing only one match of the four-match round-robin. They then edged past the Tuskers in the first semi-final, winning a low-scoring match with their final pair of batsmen, passing their opponent's total of 70 with just nine balls remaining. They met the Rhinos in the final, where thanks to 74 runs from Nick Compton, a late unbeaten 39 runs off 17 balls from Andrew Hall, and economical bowling from Ray Price, they won by just one run. Compton finished the competition as the leading run-scorer, amassing 233 runs from his six matches, at an average of 38.83. Graeme Cremer and Chamu Chibhabha of the Southern Rocks and Mashonaland Eagles respectively claimed the most wickets, taking 11 each.

The competition also saw the return of Brian Lara to professional cricket after a two-year absence. Lara was described by international contemporary Kumar Sangakkara as "one of the greatest batsmen the world has seen", shortly after the West Indian's retirement from cricket. However, in early 2010 he had negotiations with Surrey to play Twenty20 cricket for them in the 2010 Friends Provident t20.  When the talks fell through, Lara insisted that he still wanted to return to play Twenty20 cricket, a format which he hadn't played during his career. On 5 November, it was announced that he would join the Southern Rocks to play in the Stanbic Bank 20 Series. On his debut for the Rocks, and his first-ever Twenty20 match, he scored a half-century, top-scoring for the Rocks with 65. He added 34 runs in his next two innings, but then left the competition, citing "commitments elsewhere".

Fixtures and results

Group stage

Knockout stage

Semi-finals

Third-place play-off

Final

References

Stanbic Bank 20 Series, 2010-11
Stanbic Bank 20 Series, 2010-11
Stanbic Bank 20 Series
Stanbic Bank 20 Series